No. 454 Squadron was a unit of the Royal Australian Air Force (RAAF) that served during World War II. The squadron was raised in Australia under the Empire Air Training Scheme in mid-1941, but was disbanded shortly afterwards. It was re-formed later in 1941 from mainly British personnel and subsequently took part in the fighting in the Mediterranean and Middle East theatre before being disbanded in August 1945.

History

Formation
Raised under the Article XV provisions of the Empire Air Training Scheme, No. 454 Squadron came into existence at Williamtown in New South Wales on 23 May 1941. Upon formation, the squadron was intended for service in Europe with the Royal Air Force, but it disbanded shortly afterwards on 11 July, and its personnel posted to various other squadrons including Nos. 456, 457 and 458 Squadrons.

Middle East
On 2 April 1942, No. 454 Squadron was re-raised at Blackpool in the United Kingdom in a reconnaissance/light-bomber role, from RAF personnel. Two months later, the squadron was transferred to Egypt, where the ground crews were sent to RAF Aqir to service aircraft from other squadrons; they moved to the Suez shortly after this. In late September, the squadron received aircrew and concentrated at Aqir again. It proceeded to Iraq where it was equipped with Bristol Blenheims. During this time the squadron was based at Qaiyara, and was employed in a training role, providing Blenheim refresher training for crews from other RAF squadrons. In October, Wing Commander Ian Campbell took command.

Early in 1943, the squadron moved to Gianaclis, near Alexandria, where it was re-equipped with Martin Baltimores. In February, it became part of RAF Middle East Command's 201 Group, based at LG.91 RAF El Amiriya in Egypt, and was re-roled as a maritime patrol squadron. Operating in the Mediterranean Theatre for a period of almost a year and a half, No. 454 Squadron attacked targets in Greece and Crete, concentrating on anti-submarine patrols and striking merchant shipping, operating from a number of different locations including Amiriya, LG.143/Gambut III, RAF St Jean and Berka III. During this period, although notionally an Australian squadron, the majority of its personnel came from other Commonwealth countries.

Italy
In July 1944, the squadron was committed to the Italian campaign, moving to Pescara, where it was assigned to the Desert Air Force. During this time, it was re-roled as a daylight bomber squadron, supporting the British Eighth Army. The squadron moved between a number of different airfields as the fighting advanced, and even attacked targets in Yugoslavia. According to the Australian War Memorial, No. 454 Squadron "earned a reputation for efficiency, despite Italy's climatic extremes..." utilising techniques such as radar-controlled bombing. In early 1945, it was converted to the night intruder role, attacking German forces as they withdrew north. The squadron's last sorties were flown on 1 May 1945, the day before the German forces in Italy surrendered. Following the conclusion of hostilities, No. 454 Squadron was disbanded on 14 August 1945, while it was at Villaorba. During the war the squadron suffered 60 Australian fatalities. Its final commanding officer was a RAAF officer, Wing Commander John Rees DFC, DFC(US).

Aircraft operated

Commanding officers

See also
Article XV squadrons

Notes

References

Further reading

External links

 454 and 459 RAAF Squadrons Association

Australian Article XV squadrons of World War II
Military units and formations established in 1941
Military units and formations disestablished in 1945
Military units and formations in Mandatory Palestine in World War II